The Little Missouri River Bridge, also known as the Nachitoch Bluff Bridge, is a historic bridge between rural southern Clark County, Arkansas and Nevada County, Arkansas. Now closed to traffic, it once carried County Road 179 (apparently now numbered CR 479) over the Little Missouri River. Believed to be built in 1910, it is the only known Camelback Pratt truss bridge in the state. The bridge is located on the historic route of the Natchitoches Trace, an early colonial French-Spanish trail through the area.

The bridge was listed on the National Register of Historic Places in 1990.

See also
List of bridges documented by the Historic American Engineering Record in Arkansas
List of bridges on the National Register of Historic Places in Arkansas
National Register of Historic Places listings in Clark County, Arkansas

References

External links

Road bridges on the National Register of Historic Places in Arkansas
Bridges completed in 1910
Historic American Engineering Record in Arkansas
National Register of Historic Places in Clark County, Arkansas
Pratt truss bridges in the United States
Transportation in Nevada County, Arkansas
National Register of Historic Places in Nevada County, Arkansas
1910 establishments in Arkansas
Parker truss bridges in the United States
Bridge